Tähti is a Finnish surname and Estonian feminine given name meaning "star". Notable people with the name include:

Given name
Tähti Alver (born 1994), Estonian triple jumper and long jumper

Surname
Annikki Tähti (1929–2017), Finnish schlager singer
Filip Almström-Tähti (1991), Swedish football defender
Jouni Tähti (1968), Finnish disabled pool player
Leo-Pekka Tähti (1983), athlete and Paralympian from Finland

See also
Takhti (surname)

Estonian feminine given names
Finnish-language surnames